The 2003 Delta State gubernatorial election occurred on April 19, 2003. Incumbent Governor, PDP's James Ibori won election for a second term, defeating ANPP's Lucky Oghene Omoru and four other candidates.

James Ibori emerged winner in the PDP gubernatorial primary election. His running mate was Benjamin Elue.

Electoral system
The Governor of Delta State is elected using the plurality voting system.

Results
A total of six candidates registered with the Independent National Electoral Commission to contest in the election. Incumbent Governor, PDP's James Ibori won election for a second term, defeating five other candidates.

The total number of registered voters in the state was 1,607,337. However, only 56.44% (i.e. 907,251) of registered voters participated in the exercise.

References 

Delta State gubernatorial elections
Gubernatorial election 2003
Delta State gubernatorial election